Oecomys catherinae, also known as the Atlantic Forest oecomys, is a species of rodent in the genus Oecomys from eastern Brazil.

It lives in a variety of habitats including in the Atlantic Forest, Cerrado and Caatinga ecoregions. It is related to Oecomys trinitatis, but has thicker fur.

References

Literature cited

Oecomys
Endemic fauna of Brazil
Mammals of Brazil
Rodents of South America
Fauna of the Atlantic Forest
Fauna of the Caatinga
Fauna of the Cerrado
Mammals described in 1909
Taxa named by Oldfield Thomas